The Scot Abroad is a book by John Hill Burton. Published in 1864, the book consists of two volumes. The first volume deals with relations between Scotland and France; the second deals with more general topics.

References

External links 
Full text

1864 non-fiction books
History books about Scotland
1864 in Scotland
France–Scotland relations
History books about France
19th-century history books